Gaomei Wetlands, officially Gaomei Wetland Preservation Area, is a wetland in Qingshui District, Taichung, Taiwan.

History
Gaomei Wetlands was established on 29 September 2005. In August 2015, Typhoon Soudelor destroyed 6 out of 18 wind turbines of Taiwan Power Company in the area. In October 2019, a bridge connecting Taichung mainland with the wetlands area failed a safety inspection in the aftermath of Nanfang'ao Bridge collapse 3 weeks earlier in Su'ao Township, Yilan County. The Binhai Bridge was examined by Taiwan International Ports Corporation. It spans over a length of 70 meters and was 45 years old by the time of inspection.

Geography
Gaomei Wetlands is a flat land which spans over 300 hectares, but it is only about 10% of Dadu River wetlands.

Transportation
Gaomei Wetlands is accessible by bus from Qingshui Station of Taiwan Railways.

See also
 List of tourist attractions in Taiwan
 Sicao Wetlands

References

External links

  

2005 establishments in Taiwan
Landforms of Taichung
Wetlands of Taiwan